Richard Foley (1580–1657) was a prominent English ironmaster. He is best known from the folktale of "Fiddler Foley", which is either not correct or does not apply to him.

Ironmaster
Richard was the son of another Richard Foley (1551-1600), a nailer at Dudley, though the son is likely to have traded in nails rather than making them. In the 1620s, he became a partner in a network of ironworks in south Staffordshire, which were undoubtedly the source of the family's fortune.

"Fiddler Foley"
According to the folktale, "Fiddler Foley", he went to Sweden where, posing as a simple fiddler, he succeeded in discovering the secret of the slitting mill, which was enabling the price of English nails to be undercut. He returned home and set up a slitting mill at Hyde Mill in Kinver, thus making his fortune. Unfortunately, the earliest version of the legend, while applying to Hyde Mill, referred not to Richard Foley, but to a member of the Brindley family, who owned the mill until the 1730s. This may possibly have been George Brindley, Richard's brother-in-law. Richard certainly leased Hyde Mill in 1627 and converted it to a slitting mill, though it was not the first in England or even in the Midlands.

Family
Richard Foley married twice, and was able to set up several of his sons as gentlemen or in other prominent positions.

By his first marriage: 
Richard Foley (1614–1678) of Birmingham, and then an ironmaster at Longton in north Staffordshire.

By his second marriage to Alice Brindley, daughter of Sir William Brindley of Willenhal:
Thomas Foley (1616-1677), another prominent ironmaster, whose descendant was elevated to the peerage as Baron Foley.
Robert Foley (d. 1676), ironmonger
Priscilla, who married first Ezekiel Wallis and then in 1665 Henry Glover
Samuel Foley, a cleric, of Clonmel and Dublin
John Foley (1631-c.1684), a Turkey merchant, i.e. a trader with the Levant.

References

R. G. Schafer (ed.), A selection from the Records of Philip Foley's Stour Valley Iron Works (Worcs. Hist. Soc., n.s. 9 (1978), xvii-xviii.
P. W. King, 'The Development of the iron industry in south Staffordshire in the 17th century: history and myth' ''Trans. Staffs. Arch. & Hist. Soc. XXXVIII (1999 for 1996-7), 59-76.
The story is also told in the 1902 novel, "Nebo the Nailer" by Sabine Baring-Gould. New edition Praxis Books, 2014.

1580 births
1657 deaths
British ironmasters
Richard
17th-century English businesspeople
Business people from Worcester, England